The 2014 Tour of Hainan was the 9th edition of the Tour of Hainan, an annual professional road bicycle racing stage race held in China. The race was rated by the Union Cycliste Internationale (UCI) as a 2.HC (hors category) race, held as part of the 2013–14 UCI Asia Tour.

Teams
Twenty teams competed in the 2014 Tour of Hainan. These included three UCI ProTeams, three UCI Professional Continental, twelve UCI Continental teams and two national teams.

The teams that participated in the race were:

Hong Kong (national team)

Ukraine (national team)

Route

Stages

Stage 1
20 October 2014 — Chengmai to Chengmai,

Stage 2
21 October 2014 — Chengmai to Haikou,

Stage 3
22 October 2014 — Haikou to Yueliangwan,

Stage 4
23 October 2014 — Wenchang to Xinglong,

Stage 5
24 October 2014 — Wanning to Sanya,

Stage 6
25 October 2014 — Sanya to Dongfang,

Stage 7
26 October 2014 — Dongfang to Wuzhishan,

Stage 8
27 October 2014 — Wuzhishan to Danzhou,

Stage 9
28 October 2014 — Danzhou to Chengmai,

Classification leadership table

References

External links

Tour of Hainan
Tour of Hainan
Tour of Hainan
Tour of Hainan